Satberia is a village in the Goghat II CD block  in the Arambagh subdivision of Hooghly district in the Indian state of West Bengal.

History
Khudiram Chattopadhyay, father of Gadadhar Chattopadhyay (Sri Ramakrishna) used to perform priestly duties in the Raghubir temple at Satberia, during the period when Ramananda Rai was zamindar of this village. (Photographer's note with the pictures).

Geography

Area overview
The Arambagh subdivision, presented in the map alongside, is divided into two physiographic parts – the Dwarakeswar River being the dividing line. The western part is upland and rocky – it is extension of the terrain of neighbouring Bankura district. The eastern part is flat alluvial plain area.  The railways, the roads and flood-control measures have had an impact on the area. The area is overwhelmingly rural with 94.77% of the population living in rural areas and 5.23% of the population living in urban areas.

Note: The map alongside presents some of the notable locations in the subdivision. All places marked in the map are linked in the larger full screen map.

Location
Satberia is located at

Demographics
As per the 2011 Census of India, Satberia had a total population of 1,378 of which 725 (53%) were males and 653 (47%) were females. Population in the age range 0–6 years was 149. The total number of literate persons in Satberia was 957 (77.87% of the population over 6 years).

Satberia picture gallery

References

External links

Villages in Hooghly district